The short-tailed scimitar babbler (Napothera danjoui) is a species of bird in the family Pellorneidae.
It is found in Laos and Vietnam.
Its natural habitats are subtropical or tropical moist lowland forest and subtropical or tropical moist montane forest.
It is threatened by habitat loss. The Naung Mung scimitar babbler was formerly considered a distinct species, but is now considered conspecific.

References

Collar, N. J. & Robson, C. 2007. Family Timaliidae (Babblers)  pp. 70 – 291 in; del Hoyo, J., Elliott, A. & Christie, D.A. eds. Handbook of the Birds of the World, Vol. 12. Picathartes to Tits and Chickadees. Lynx Edicions, Barcelona.

short-tailed scimitar babbler
Birds of Vietnam
short-tailed scimitar babbler
Taxonomy articles created by Polbot
Taxobox binomials not recognized by IUCN